Tabarchino is a dialect of the Ligurian language spoken in Sardinia.

Tabarchino is spoken in the communities of Carloforte on San Pietro Island and Calasetta on Sant'Antioco Island, which are located in the Archipelago of Sulcis in the Province of South Sardinia.

Tabarchino enjoys regional recognition through the laws on the promotion of the Sardinian language and culture (l.r. N.26/97, l.r. N.22/18).

Carloforte Tabarchino retains very few archaisms and is very close to modern Genoese; on the other hand, Calasetta Tabarchino has many more archaisms and is very close to 17th century Ligurian, and its lexicon is also more Sardinian-influenced. The two dialects share words of Tunisian Arabic and French derivation.

See also
 Gallo-Italic languages
 Ligurian (Romance language)
 Tabarka
 Carloforte
 Calasetta

Notes

Further reading 

 

Languages of Italy
Ligurian language (Romance)
Sardinian culture
Province of South Sardinia
Languages attested from the 18th century